Live at Madison Square Garden 1978 is a concert video and an album by British rock band Jethro Tull, released in 2009. It was recorded on 9 October 1978 at Madison Square Garden in New York City.

50 minutes of the performance were broadcast live via satellite on the BBC's Old Grey Whistle Test TV show.

Track listing 
All songs written and composed by Ian Anderson, except where noted.

 "Sweet Dream" – 6:52
 "One Brown Mouse" – 3:24
 "Heavy Horses" – 7:22
 "Thick as a Brick" – 11:23
 "No Lullaby (incl. Flute Solo)" – 9:00
 "Songs from the Wood" – 4:53
 "Quatrain" (instrumental) (Martin Barre) – 0:41
 "Aqualung" (Ian Anderson, Jennie Anderson) – 8:04
 "Locomotive Breath (incl. Dambusters March)"  (Ian Anderson, Eric Coates) – 15:40
 "Too Old to Rock 'n' Roll: Too Young to Die" – 4:17
 "My God/Cross-Eyed Mary" – 6:59

DVD Track listing 

Start of Concert Recording (audio only)
 "Sweet Dream"
 "One Brown Mouse"
 "Heavy Horses"
Start of broadcast – video
 "Opening"
 "Thick as a Brick"
 "No Lullaby (incl. Flute Solo)"
 "Songs from the Wood"
 "Band intro"
 "Quatrain" (Instrumental)
 "Aqualung"
 "Locomotive Breath (incl. Dambusters March)"
End of broadcast – video (During "Locomotive Breath")
 "Too Old to Rock 'N' Roll: Too Young to Die"
 "My God/Cross-Eyed Mary"
Encore
 "Locomotive Breath (incl. Dambusters March)"

Personnel
Jethro Tull
 Ian Anderson – vocals, flute, guitar
 Martin Barre – electric guitar
 John Evan – piano, organ, synthesizers
 Barriemore Barlow – drums, glockenspiel
 David Palmer – portative pipe organ, synthesizers

Guest Musician
 Tony Williams – bass guitar

See also 
 Living with the Past

References

Jethro Tull (band) video albums
Live video albums
Jethro Tull (band) live albums
2009 video albums
2009 live albums
Chrysalis Records live albums
Live progressive rock albums
Chrysalis Records video albums
Concert films
Albums recorded at Madison Square Garden